Melissa Dyrdahl is a startup founder, nonprofit board member, and software executive. She co-founded software consultancy 33 Teams, and has been a fellow at Stanford's Distinguished Careers Institute since 2018.

Career
In the early 1980s, Dyrdahl started her career working for a small ad agency. She later held several marketing management positions at Hewlett-Packard and was director of worldwide sales operations at Claris, the software subsidiary of Apple Computer.

Dyrdahl joined Adobe Systems Incorporated as a founding member of the Home and Office Products Division when Adobe acquired Aldus Corporation in 1994, and eventually become Adobe's senior vice president of Corporate Marketing and Communications. Dyrdahl later oversaw the marketing and communications efforts related to Adobe's 2005 acquisition of Macromedia. She was also responsible for Adobe's Education business and the company's Corporate Social Responsibility efforts.

Dyrdahl conceived, designed and launched Bring Light, to connect donors and charities for more informed and effective online fundraising. Bring Light was acquired in 2011 by Rally.org.

She joined Pivotal Labs as vice president in 2011. She built the marketing function for the software development firm that provided design, development and product management services to clients including Twitter, Groupon and Crescendo Bioscience.

Dyrdahl was the President and chief executive officer of Ella Health, a woman's health provider based in San Francisco, CA but expanded nationally. The company provided 3D Mammography and women's physical therapy services. Ella Health had centers in Chicago, IL; Langhorne, PA; Lemoyne, PA; Pike Creek, DE; San Antonio, TX; San Francisco, CA; and Tom's River, NJ.

Nonprofit, Volunteer, and Honorary Positions

CommonSpirit Health (formerly Dignity Health) Foundation Board of Directors.

Dyrdahl is on the board of Resource, an independent, digital marketing agency.

Dyrdahl was the chair of the board of directors for the Humane Society Silicon Valley. In November 2008, Dyrdahl was named an Executive in Residence at San Jose State University's College of Business. She was also the VP of Marketing for the San Jose State University Alumni Association.

Dyrdahl is a former trustee of the San Jose Museum of Art, and was on the advisory board for the CMO Council and the western region advisory board for Catalyst, a research and advisory organization working to advance women in business.

Awards and honors

In May 2004, Dyrdahl was named "Best Marketing Executive" by the American Business Awards. She is also a recipient of the YWCA Tribute to Women in Industry award and is an active mentor, was named one of San Jose's Distinguished Women in Business, and was named one of the "2010 Women of Influence" in Silicon Valley

Dyrdahl is used extensively as an example of a "New Radical" in Julia Moulden's book 'We Are the New Radicals: A Manifesto for Reinventing Yourself and Saving the World'.

In 2013, Dyrdahl was inducted into the East Side Union High School District Education Foundation Thomas P. Ryan Hall of Fame established to honor the outstanding achievements of graduates of East Side Union High School. Other inductees include Yahoo Founder Jerry Yang, U.S. Congressman Mike Honda, and former NFL quarterback Jim Plunkett.

References

External links
 Ella Health

Living people
San Jose State University people
American women chief executives
American health care chief executives
Year of birth missing (living people)